Streptomyces spiroverticillatus is a bacterium species from the genus of Streptomyces which has been isolated from soil in Japan. Streptomyces spiroverticillatus produces tautomycin.

Further reading

See also 
 List of Streptomyces species

References

External links
Type strain of Streptomyces spiroverticillatus at BacDive -  the Bacterial Diversity Metadatabase

spiroverticillatus
Bacteria described in 1958